Jonah is a book of poems by Peter Porter accompanying reproductions of artwork by Arthur Boyd.  It was published by Secker & Warburg on 22 October 1973.  2000 copies were printed, and the retail price was £4.75.

Porter had met Boyd at a poetry festival  at the Royal Court Theatre in 1965.

The book commences with three pages reproducing an old copy of the Book of Jonah.

References
 Bennett, Bruce, Spirit in Exile: Peter Porter and His Poetry, Oxford, 1991, .
 Kaiser, John R: Peter Porter: A Bibliography 1954 – 1986 Mansell, London and New York, 1990. .

Footnotes

1973 poetry books
Australian poetry collections
Secker & Warburg books